Kestutis Smirnovas is a Lithuanian MMA fighter and Judoka who fought in Pride Fighting Championships, RINGS, Shooto and HERO'S. He is also a politician and a public figure.

Mixed martial arts career

Early career
Smirnovas started his career in 2000. He fought mainly for Rings Lithuania and Shooto Lithuania, obtaining a record of sixteen victories and five losses until the first half of 2005.

K-1 and K-1 Hero's
Smirnovas faced Tadeush Cholodinskij on March 10, 2006 at K-1: East Europe Max GP for the K-1 East Europe Max heavyweight title. He won via split decision after three, five-minutes rounds.

Smirnovas faced Pride FC veteran Kazushi Sakuraba on August 5, 2006 at K-1 Hero's 6 in the quarterfinal of Hero's 2006 light heavyweight grand prix. Despite dominating the beginning of the contest, almost knocking Sakuraba out with a long sequence of ground-and-pound, Smirnovas lost via submission due to an armbar still in the first round.

Smirnovas replaced Sakuraba in the semifinal as he was unable to compete due to medical conditions. He faced Yoshihiro Akiyama on October 9, 2006 at K-1 Hero's 7, losing via TKO in the first round.

Championships and accomplishments

Mixed martial arts
K-1
K-1 East Europe Max heavyweight title (2006)

Mixed martial arts record

|-
| Win
| align=center| 24–8–1
| Grzegorz Lenart
| Submission (armbar)
| King of Kings: World Grand Prix 2014 in Vilnius
| 
| align=center| 1
| align=center| 1:35
| Vilnius, Lithuania
|
|-
| Win
| align=center| 23–8–1
| Mike Jonker
| Submission (rear-naked choke)
| Bushido Lithuania - Hero's 2013
| 
| align=center| 1
| align=center| 3:58
| Vilnius, Lithuania
|
|-
| Win
| align=center| 22–8–1
| David Marcina
| Submission (kimura)
| Shooto Lithuania: Bushido 2008
| 
| align=center| 1
| align=center| 0:37
| Vilnius, Lithuania
| 
|-
| Win
| align=center| 21–8–1
| Damba Radnaev
| Submission (armbar)
| K-1 Hero's: Hero's Lithuania 2007
| 
| align=center| 1
| align=center| 4:20
| Vilnius, Lithuania
| 
|-
| Win
| align=center| 20–8–1
| Vladimir Yushko
| Submission (armbar)
| Bushido Lithuania: Battle of Saule 2
| 
| align=center| 1
| align=center| 1:40
| Siauliai, Lithuania
| 
|-
| Loss
| align=center| 19–8–1
| Nobutatsu Suzuki
| TKO (doctor stoppage)
| Zst 13
| 
| align=center| 1
| align=center| 5:00
| Tokyo, Japan
| 
|-
| Draw
| align=center| 19–7–1
| Valentin Golubovskij
| Draw
| K-1: East Europe Max
| 
| align=center| 3
| align=center| N/A
| Vilnius, Lithuania
| 
|-
| Win
| align=center| 19–7
| Thomas Valentin
| KO (punches)
| K-1 Hero's Lithuania
| 
| align=center| 1
| align=center| 3:01
| Vilnius, Lithuania
| 
|-
| Loss
| align=center| 18–7
| Yoshihiro Akiyama
| TKO (punches)
| K-1 Hero's 7
| 
| align=center| 1
| align=center| 3:01
| Yokohama, Japan
| 
|-
| Loss
| align=center| 18–6
| Kazushi Sakuraba
| Submission (armbar)
| K-1 Hero's 6
| 
| align=center| 1
| align=center| 6:41
| Tokyo, Japan
| 
|-
| Win
| align=center| 18–5
| Tadeush Cholodinskij
| Decision (split)
| K-1: East Europe Max GP
| 
| align=center| 3
| align=center| 5:00
| Vilnius, Lithuania
| 
|-
| Win
| align=center| 17–5
| Hiromitsu Miura
| TKO (punches)
| K-1 Hero's: Hero's Lithuania 2005
| 
| align=center| 1
| align=center| 4:30
| Vilnius, Lithuania
| 
|-
| Win
| align=center| 16–5
| Grazhuydas Smailis
| Submission (armbar)
| Shooto Lithuania: Chaosas
| 
| align=center| N/A
| align=center| N/A
| Vilnius, Lithuania
| 
|-
| Loss
| align=center| 15–5
| Rodolfo Amaro da Silva
| TKO
| Shooto Lithuania - Bushido
| 
| align=center| 2
| align=center| 2:58
| Vilnius, Lithuania
| 
|-
| Loss
| align=center| 15–4
| Sam Nest
| Submission (rear-naked choke)
| Zst: Grand Prix 2 Opening Round
| 
| align=center| 2
| align=center| 4:58
| Tokyo, Japan
| 
|-
| Win
| align=center| 15–3
| Romualds Garkulis
| Submission (rear-naked choke)
| Shooto Lithuania: Gladiators
| 
| align=center| 1
| align=center| 1:37
| Vilnius, Lithuania
| 
|-
| Win
| align=center| 14–3
| Petras Markevicius
| Submission (choke)
| Shooto Lithuania: Bushido King
| 
| align=center| 1
| align=center| 0:50
| Vilnius, Lithuania
| 
|-
| Win
| align=center| 13–3
| Vidmantas Tatarunas
| Submission (choke)
| Bushido Lithuania: Storm
| 
| align=center| N/A
| align=center| N/A
| Sakiai, Lithuania
| 
|-
| Win
| align=center| 12–3
| Grazhuydas Smailis
| Submission (rear-naked choke)
| Shooto Lithuania: Vendetta
| 
| align=center| 2
| align=center| 5:00
| Vilnius, Lithuania
| 
|-
| Win
| align=center| 11–3
| Egidijus Petrushkevicius
| align=center| N/A
| Bushido Lithuania: Ronin
| 
| align=center| N/A
| align=center| N/A
| Alytus, Lithuania
| 
|-
| Win
| align=center| 10–3
| Grzegorz Jakubowski
| Submission (rear-naked choke)
| Shooto Lithuania: King of Bushido Stage 3
| 
| align=center| 1
| align=center| 1:35
| Vilnius, Lithuania
| 
|-
| Win
| align=center| 9–3
| Roman Sukoterin
| Decision (split)
| Shooto Lithuania: King of Bushido Stage 1
| 
| align=center| 2
| align=center| 5:00
| Vilnius, Lithuania
| 
|-
| Win
| align=center| 8–3
| Masaya Inoue
| TKO (retirement)
| Shooto - 9/5 in Korakuen Hall
| 
| align=center| 1
| align=center| 5:00
| Tokyo, Japan
| 
|-
| Win
| align=center| 7–3
| Kestutis Stankevicius
| Decision
| Rings Lithuania: Explosion
| 
| align=center| N/A
| align=center| N/A
| Kaunas, Lithuania
| 
|-
| Win
| align=center| 6–3
| Mariusz Ligizynski
| Submission (kimura)
| Rings Lithuania: Bushido Rings 7 – Adrenalinas
| 
| align=center| 1
| align=center| 2:45
| Vilnius, Lithuania
| 
|-
| Win
| align=center| 5–3
| Darius Jonyla
| Submission (armbar)
| Rings Lithuania: Bushido Rings 6: Dynamite
| 
| align=center| N/A
| align=center| N/A
| Kaunas, Lithuania
| 
|-
| Win
| align=center| 4–3
| Vladimir Smantster
| Submission (armbar)
| Rings Lithuania: Bushido Rings 5: Shock
| 
| align=center| 1
| align=center| N/A
| Vilnius, Lithuania
| 
|-
| Win
| align=center| 3–3
| Takahiro Oba
| Submission (armbar)
| Pride FC: The Best, Vol. 3
| 
| align=center| 1
| align=center| 0:55
| Tokyo, Japan
| 
|-
| Win
| align=center| 2–3
| Pavel Dolgov
| Decision
| Rings Lithuania: Bushido Rings 4
| 
| align=center| 2
| align=center| 5:00
| Kaunas, Lithuania
| 
|-
| Loss
| align=center| 1–3
| Hirotaka Yokoi
| Decision
| Rings Lithuania: Bushido Rings 3
| 
| align=center| 2
| align=center| 5:00
| Vilnius, Lithuania
| 
|-
| Loss
| align=center| 1–2
| Mikhail Ilyukhin
| Submission (achilles lock)
| Rings Lithuania: Bushido Rings 2
| 
| align=center| 1
| align=center| N/A
| Vilnius, Lithuania
| 
|-
| Win
| align=center| 1–1
| Ruslan Mirzoev
| Decision (3–2 points)
| Rings Russia: Russia vs. Bulgaria
| 
| align=center| 1
| align=center| 10:00
| Ekaterinburg, Russia
| 
|-
| Loss
| align=center| 0–1
| Victor Yerohin
| Submission (leg lock)
| Rings Lithuania: Bushido Rings 1
| 
| align=center| 1
| align=center| 8:00
| Vilnius, Lithuania
|

Politics and activism

Social activities: President of Šakiai judo sports club "Audra", member of the board of the Šakiai branch of LVTGO "Save the Children", member of the board of the Šakiai youth union "Apskritas stalas"

Since 2007 he is council member of  Šakių district municipality.

In 2016 he was elected to the Seimas, defeating Prime Minister Algirdas Butkevičius in the Vilkaviškis electoral district.

Personal
Daughter Julija Smirnovaitė from the first marriage with Gintarė,  Simona, Paulina, Jakūbas from the second marriage.

References

External links

People from Šakiai
Lithuanian male mixed martial artists
Lithuanian male judoka
1976 births
Living people
Heavyweight mixed martial artists
Light heavyweight mixed martial artists
Mixed martial artists utilizing judo
Sportspeople from Vilnius
21st-century Lithuanian politicians
Lithuanian politicians